Yaguer is an elevated hilly plateau area in the northern part of the Dikhil Region in Djibouti. The mountains constitute the highest point in Dikhil Region. With a mean height of 1379 metres, is the fourth highest point in Djibouti. The average temperature for the highlands is approximately 17°C.

Overview
It is the main town in the region, and is Yoboki located 18 km south. A number of birds are found in the mountains including Egyptian vulture. Other endemic species include a number of geckos and lizards.

Climate
Yaguer enjoys a mild climate throughout the winter and moderately sunny summer.

See also
Arrei Mountains
Garbi

References

Mountains of Djibouti